Bollinger Creek is a stream in Camden County in the U.S. state of Missouri.

Bollinger Creek was named after the local Bollinger family.

See also
List of rivers of Missouri

References

Rivers of Camden County, Missouri
Rivers of Missouri